Battle of Monte Cassino order of battle January 1944 is a listing of the significant formations that were involved in the fighting on the Winter Line January 1944 during the period generally known as the First Battle of Monte Cassino.

Allied Armies in Italy
C-in-C: General Sir Harold Alexander
Chief of Staff: Lieutenant-General Sir John Harding

U.S. Fifth Army
Commander:
Lieutenant-General Mark Wayne Clark

British X Corps (left)
Lieutenant-General Sir Richard McCreery
  British 5th Infantry Division (Major-General Gerald Bucknall to 22 January then Major-General P. G. S. Gregson-Ellis)
13th Infantry Brigade (Brigadier L. M. Campbell)
2nd Battalion, Cameronians (Scottish Rifles)
2nd Battalion, Royal Inniskilling Fusiliers
2nd Battalion, Wiltshire Regiment
15th Infantry Brigade (Brigadier E. O. Martin until 22 January then Brigadier John Yeldham Whitfield)
1st Battalion, Green Howards
1st Battalion, King's Own Yorkshire Light Infantry
1st Battalion, York and Lancaster Regiment
17th Infantry Brigade (Brigadier Dudley Ward)
2nd Battalion, Royal Scots Fusiliers
2nd Battalion, Northamptonshire Regiment
6th Battalion, Seaforth Highlanders
201st Guards Brigade (under command) (Brigadier R. B. R. Colvin)
6th Battalion, Grenadier Guards
3rd Battalion, Coldstream Guards
2nd Battalion, Scots Guards
Divisional troops
91st (4th London) Field Regiment, Royal Artillery
92nd (5th London) Field Regiment, Royal Artillery
98th (Surrey & Sussex Yeomanry Queen Mary's) Field Regiment, Royal Artillery
156th (Lanarkshire Yeomanry) Field Regiment, Royal Artillery
102nd (Pembroke Yeomanry) Medium Regiment, Royal Artillery
52nd (6th London) Anti-Tank Regiment, Royal Artillery
18th Light Anti-aircraft Regiment, Royal Artillery
215th (Gosport & Fareham) Heavy Anti-Aircraft Battery, Royal Artillery
5th Reconnaissance Regiment
50th Royal Tank Regiment (One squadron attached from Corps troops)
7th Battalion, Cheshire Regiment (Machine gun)
245th, 252nd and 38th Field companies, Royal Engineers
254th Field Park Company, RE
18th Bridge Platoon, RE
  British 46th Infantry Division (Major-General John Hawkesworth)
128th Infantry Brigade (Brigadier Manley Angell James)
2nd Battalion, Hampshire Regiment
1/4th Battalion, Hampshire Regiment
5th Battalion, Hampshire Regiment
138th Infantry Brigade (Brigadier G. P. Harding)
6th Battalion, Lincolnshire Regiment
2/4th Battalion, King's Own Yorkshire Light Infantry
6th Battalion, York and Lancaster Regiment
139th Infantry Brigade (Brigadier R. E. H. Stott)
2/5th Battalion, Leicestershire Regiment
5th Battalion, Sherwood Foresters
16th Battalion, Durham Light Infantry
Divisional troops
70th (West Riding) Field Regiment, Royal Artillery
71st (West Riding) Field Regiment, Royal Artillery
172nd Field Regiment, Royal Artillery
5th Medium Regiment, Royal Artillery
58th (Duke of Wellington's Regiment) Anti-Tank Regiment, Royal Artillery
115th Light Anti-Aircraft Regiment, Royal Artillery
215th Heavy Anti-aircraft Battery, Royal Artillery
46th Reconnaissance Regiment
2nd Battalion, Royal Northumberland Fusiliers (Machine gun)
270th, 271st and 272nd Field companies, Royal Engineers
273rd Field Park Company, RE
201st Bridge Platoon, RE
40th Royal Tank Regiment (attached from Corps troops)
  British 56th Infantry Division (Major-General Gerald Templer)
167th (London) Infantry Brigade (Brigadier C. E. A. Firth until 29 January then Brigadier J. Scott-Elliott)
8th Battalion, Royal Fusiliers
9th Battalion, Royal Fusiliers
7th Battalion, Oxfordshire and Buckinghamshire Light Infantry
168th (London) Infantry Brigade (Brigadier K. C. Davidson)
10th Battalion, Royal Berkshire Regiment
1st Battalion, London Scottish
1st Battalion, London Irish Rifles
169th (London) Infantry Brigade (Brigadier L. O. Lyne)
2/5th Battalion, Queen's Royal Regiment (West Surrey)
2/6th Battalion, Queen's Royal Regiment (West Surrey)
2/7th Battalion, Queen's Royal Regiment (West Surrey)
Divisional troops
64th (7th London) Field Regiment, Royal Artillery
65th (8th London) Field Regiment, Royal Artillery
113th (Home Counties) Field Regiment, Royal Artillery
142nd (Royal Devon Yeomanry) Field Regiment, Royal Artillery
51st (Midland) Medium Regiment, Royal Artillery
67th Anti-Tank Regiment, Royal Artillery
100th Light Anti-Aircraft Regiment,  Royal Artillery]]
214th (Southsea) Heavy Anti-aircraft Battery, Royal Artillery
44th Reconnaissance Regiment
6th Battalion, Cheshire Regiment (Machine gun)
220th and 221st Field Companies, Royal Engineers
501st (London) Field Company, Royal Engineers
563rd Field Park Company, RE
40th Royal Tank Regiment (One squadron attached from Corps troops
Corps Troops
 British 23rd Armoured Brigade (Brigadier Robert Arkwright)
40th Royal Tank Regiment (less detachments)
50th Royal Tank Regiment (less detachments)
11th Battalion, King's Royal Rifle Corps
 2nd Special Service Brigade (Brigadier T. D. L. Churchill)
No. 9 Commando
No. 10 (Inter Allied) Commando
No. 40 (Royal Marine) Commando
No. 43 (Royal Marine) Commando (less detachments)
2nd Army Group Royal Artillery (under command)
78th (Lowland) Field Regiment, Royal Artillery
69th (Caernarvon & Denbigh Yeomanry) Medium Regiment, Royal Artillery
74th Medium Regiment, Royal Artillery
140th (5th London) Medium Regiment, Royal Artillery
56th Heavy Regiment, Royal Artillery
146th (Pembroke & Cardiganshire) Field Regiment, Royal Artillery

U.S. II Corps (centre)
Major-General Geoffrey Keyes
 U.S. 1st Armored Division (Major General Ernest N. Harmon)
6th Armored Infantry Regiment
3 Armoured Infantry Battalions
1st Armored Regiment
3 Tank Battalions
13th Armored Regiment
3 Tank Battalions
67th Armored Regiment
3 Tank Battalions
Divisional troops
27th, 68th and 91st Armored Field Artillery Battalions
16th Engineer Battalion
81st Reconnaissance Squadron
601st Tank Destroyer Battalion (Self Propelled) (Attached)
 U.S. 34th Infantry Division (Major General Charles W. Ryder)
133rd Infantry Regiment
3 infantry battalions (1st, 3rd, 100th)
135th Infantry Regiment
3 infantry battalions
168th Infantry Regiment
3 infantry battalions
Divisional troops
125th, 151st and 175th (105mm) Artillery Battalions 
185th (155mm) Artillery Battalion 
109th Engineer Battalion
 U.S. 36th Infantry Division (Major General Fred L. Walker)
141st Infantry Regiment
3 infantry battalions
142nd Infantry Regiment
3 infantry battalions
143rd Infantry Regiment
3 infantry battalions
Divisional troops
131st, 132nd and 133rd (105mm) Artillery Battalions 
155th (155mm) Artillery Battalion 
111th Engineer Battalion
 1st Special Service Force (Brigadier-General Robert T. Frederick)
3 Regiments of two battalions. Each battalion two companies.
1 battery airborne artillery
 1st Italian Motorised Group (Brigadier-General Vincenzo Dapino)
67th Infantry Regiment
51st Bersaglieri Battalion
11th Artillery Regiment
5th Anti-tank Regiment
One engineer battalion

French Expeditionary Corps (right)
General Alphonse Juin
 3rd Algerian Infantry Division (Major-General Joseph de Goislard de Monsabert)
3rd Algerian Tirailleurs Regiment
3 battalions
4th Tunisian Tirailleurs Regiment
3 battalions
7th Algerian Tirailleurs Regiment
3 battalions
4th Group of Tabors
3 tabors
Divisional troops
67th African Artillery Regiment
83rd Engineer Battalion
3rd Algerian Spahis Reconnaissance Regiment
 2nd Moroccan Infantry Division (Brigadier-General André M. Dody)
4th Moroccan Tirailleurs Regiment
3 battalions
5th Moroccan Tirailleurs Regiment
3 battalions
8th Moroccan Tirailleurs Regiment
3 battalions
3rd Group of Tabors
3 tabors
Divisional troops
63rd African Artillery Regiment
87th Engineer Battalion
3rd Moroccan Spahis Reconnaissance Regiment

Army Reserve
 U.S. 45th Infantry Division (Major General William W. Eagles)
Was sent to Anzio and took no part in the fighting at Cassino

German Army Group C
Commander:
Field Marshal Albert Kesselring

German Tenth Army
Commander: General (Generaloberst) Heinrich von Vietinghoff

XIV Panzer Corps
Lieutenant-General (General der Panzertruppe) Fridolin von Senger und Etterlin
 5th Mountain Division (until 17 January) (Lieutenant General (General der Gebirgstruppe) Julius Ringel)
85th Mountain Regiment
3 battalions
100th Mountain Regiment
3 battalions
Divisional troops
95th Reconnaissance battalion
95th Mountain Artillery battalion
95th Anti-tank battalion
95th Mountain Engineer battalion
 15th Panzer Grenadier Division (Major General (Generalleutnant) Eberhard Rodt)
104th Panzer Grenadier Regiment
3 battalions
115th Panzer Grenadier Regiment
3 battalions
129th Panzer Grenadier Regiment
3 battalions
Divisional troops
115th Armoured Reconnaissance battalion
115th Panzer battalion
33rd Artillery battalion
33rd Anti-tank battalion
115th Engineer battalion
 44th Reichsgrenadier Division (Major General (Generalleutnant) Friedrich Franek)
131st Infantry Regiment
3 battalions
132nd Infantry Regiment
3 battalions
134th Infantry Regiment
3 battalions
Divisional troops
44th Fusilier battalion
96th Artillery Regiment
46th Anti-tank battalion
96th Engineer battalion
 94th Infantry Division (Major General (Generalleutnant) Bernhard Steinmetz)
267th Infantry Regiment
3 battalions
274th Infantry Regiment
3 battalions
276th Infantry Regiment
3 battalions
Divisional troops
94th Fusilier battalion
194th Artillery Regiment
194th Anti-tank battalion
94th Engineer battalion
 71st Infantry Division (from 17 January) (Major General (Generalleutnant) Wilhelm Raapke)
191st Infantry Regiment
3 battalions
194th Infantry Regiment
3 battalions
211st Infantry Regiment
3 battalions
Divisional troops
171st Fusilier battalion
171st Artillery Regiment
171st Anti-tank battalion
171st Engineer battalion
 3rd Panzergrenadier Division (relieved 5th Mountain Division on 17 January) (Lieutenant General (General der Panzertruppen) Fritz-Hubert Gräser)
8th Panzer Grenadier Regiment
3 battalions

Army Reserve
 Fallschirm-Panzer-Division 1

German I Parachute Corps
Under Kesselring's direct command)
Lieutenant-General Alfred Schlemm
 29th Panzergrenadier Division
15th Panzer Grenadier Regiment
3 battalions
71st Panzer Grenadier Regiment
3 battalions
Divisional troops
129th Armoured Reconnaissance battalion
129th Panzer battalion
29th Artillery Regiment
29th Anti-tank battalion
29th Engineer battalion
 90th Panzergrenadier Division
155th Panzer Grenadier Regiment
3 battalions
200th Panzer Grenadier Regiment
3 battalions
361st Panzer Grenadier Regiment
3 battalions
Divisional troops
190th Armoured Reconnaissance battalion
190th Panzer battalion
190th Artillery Regiment
90th Anti-tank battalion
90th Engineer battalion

Notes
Footnotes

Citations

Sources

 

 
 

Monte Cassino
Italian campaign (World War II)
Battle of Monte Cassino